Oh Yoon-ah (born October 14, 1980) is a South Korean actress and a former racing model.

Career
Oh Yoon-ah began her career as a racing model ("race queen" or "pit babe"), and in 2000 she won the first Cyber Race Queen Contest. She became an entertainment reporter for MBC's Section TV in 2003. However, she was fired in a live interview where she stayed silent for 3 minutes.

Oh made her acting debut in 2004 TV series Into the Storm, but it was her supporting role as the heroine's friend in hit sitcom Old Miss Diary that made her into a household name. She continued acting on television, starring in That Woman, Mr. Goodbye, Surgeon Bong Dal-hee, Master of Study, Marry Me, Please, and notably Alone in Love, for which she won Best Supporting Actress at the 2006 SBS Drama Awards.

Personal life
Oh married advertising executive Song Hoon at Imperial Palace Hotel Seoul on January 5, 2007. The couple divorced in 2015; they have one son, born in August 2007. Oh and her son, who has autism, were featured together on the 10th anniversary cover of The Big Issue Korea to raise awareness for people with autism.

Filmography

Television series

Film

Variety show

Web shows

Music video

Book

Awards and nominations

References

External links

Oh Yoon-ah at Polaris Entertainment

South Korean film actresses
South Korean television actresses
South Korean female models
1980 births
Living people
People from Ulsan